Denguélé may refer to:

Denguélé District, a district of Ivory Coast
Denguélé Region, a former region of Ivory Coast
AS Denguélé, a football team in Ivory Coast